West Iberian is a branch of the Ibero-Romance languages that includes the Castilian languages (Spanish, Judaeo-Spanish, Extremaduran (sometimes) and Loreto-Ucayali), Astur-Leonese (Asturian, Leonese, Mirandese, Extremaduran (sometimes) and Cantabrian), and the descendants of Galician-Portuguese (Portuguese, Galician, Eonavian, Fala, Minderico, Cafundó, and Judaeo-Portuguese). Pyrenean–Mozarabic (Aragonese and Mozarabic) may also be included.

Until a few centuries ago, they formed a dialect continuum covering the western, central and southern parts of the Iberian Peninsula—excepting the Basque and Catalan-speaking territories. This is still the situation in a few regions, particularly in the northern part of the peninsula, but due to the differing sociopolitical histories of these languages (independence of Portugal since the early 12th century, unification of Spain in the late 15th century under the Catholic Monarchs, who privileged Castilian Spanish over the other Iberian languages), Spanish and Portuguese have tended to overtake and to a large extent absorb their sister languages while they kept diverging from each other.

There is controversy over whether the members of the modern Galician-Portuguese and Astur-Leonese sub-groups are languages or dialects. A common, though disputed, classification is to state that Portuguese and Galician are separate languages, as are Asturian, Leonese, and Mirandese. Cantabrian and Extremaduran are considered codialects of the Leonese language for UNESCO, whereas the latter is a Castilian dialect in the ISO codes.

Papiamento is a West Iberian creole language spoken in the Dutch West Indies and believed to be derived from Portuguese, Judaeo-Portuguese, Spanish and Judaeo-Spanish.

Classification
Bold indicates language families. Daggers indicate extinct languages.
West Iberian
Asturleonese
Asturian
Leonese
Mirandese
Extremaduran
Cantabrian
Barranquenho
Castilian
Extremaduran
Judaeo-Spanish
Loreto-Ucayali
Spanish
Galician-Portuguese
Eonavian
Fala
Galician
 Judaeo-Portuguese
Portuguese
Pyrenean–Mozarabic
Andalusi Romance
Aragonese
Judaeo-Aragonese
Navarro-Aragonese

Notes and references

Notes

References